Hans Zanna Munthe-Kaas (born 28 March 1961) is a Norwegian mathematician at the University of Bergen,  and UiT The Arctic University of Norway working in the area of computational mathematics in the borderland between pure and applied mathematics and computer science.

He took his PhD  at the Norwegian Institute of Technology in 1989,  called to full Professor 1997 and has since 2005 been Professor of Mathematics. Since 2021 he is also working at UiT The Arctic University of Norway in Tromsø where he heads the newly established Lie-Størmer Center for fundamental structures in computational and pure mathematics.

Research 
The work of Munthe-Kaas is centred on applications of differential geometry and Lie group techniques in geometric integration and structure preserving algorithms for numerical integration of differential equations. A central aspect is the analysis of structure preservation by algebraic and combinatorial techniques (B-series and Lie–Butcher series).

In the mid-1990s Munthe-Kaas developed what are now known as Runge–Kutta–Munthe-Kaas methods, a generalisation of Runge–Kutta methods to integration of differential equations evolving on Lie groups. The analysis of numerical Lie group integrators leads to the study of new types of formal power series for flows on manifolds (Lie–Butcher series). Lie–Butcher theory combines classical B-series with Lie-series.

Algebraically, B-series are based on pre-Lie algebras, whereas the generalised Lie–Butcher series are based on the concept of post-Lie algebras. Applications in numerical integration on manifolds has led to fundamental research in the structure of post-Lie algebras and their relations to differential geometry, with ramifications in many different areas of applications.

Honors and awards 
Munthe-Kaas received Exxon Mobil Award for best PhD at NTNU, 1989, and the Carl-Erik Frōberg Prize in Numerical Mathematics 1996 for the paper "Lie–Butcher theory for Runge–Kutta Methods". Munthe-Kaas is elected member of Academia Europaea, the Norwegian Academy of Science and Letters, the Royal Norwegian Society of Sciences and Letters and the Norwegian Academy of Technological Sciences. Munthe-Kaas is the chair of the international Abel prize committee (2018-2022), he is President of the Scientific Council of Centre International de Mathématiques Pures et Appliquées (CIMPA) (2017–present) and he is Editor-in-Chief of  Journal Foundations of Computational Mathematics (2017–present).  Munthe-Kaas was secretary of Foundations of Computational Mathematics (2005–2011) and member of the Board of the Abel Prize in Mathematics (2010–2018).

Personal life
Munthe-Kaas married Antonella Zanna, an Italian numerical analyst, in 1997; they have four children and a dog.

References 

1961 births
Living people
Norwegian mathematicians
Norwegian Institute of Technology alumni
Academic staff of the University of Bergen
Members of the Norwegian Academy of Science and Letters
Royal Norwegian Society of Sciences and Letters
Members of the Norwegian Academy of Technological Sciences
Presidents of the Norwegian Mathematical Society